The 1949 Cal Poly San Dimas Broncos football team represented the Cal Poly Kellogg-Voorhis Unit—now known as California State Polytechnic University, Pomona—as an independent during the 1949 college football season. Led by second-year head coach Duane Whitehead, Cal Poly San Dimas compiled a record of 2–8. The team was outscored by its opponents 172 to 82 for the season.

Schedule

References

Cal Poly San Dimas
Cal Poly Pomona Broncos football seasons
Cal Poly Pomona Broncos football